Helena Cardoso de Menezes (22 January 1927 – December 2020) was a Brazilian sprinter. She competed in the women's 100 metres at the 1948 Summer Olympics.

References

External links
 

1927 births
2020 deaths
Athletes (track and field) at the 1948 Summer Olympics
Athletes (track and field) at the 1951 Pan American Games
Athletes (track and field) at the 1952 Summer Olympics
Brazilian female sprinters
Brazilian female long jumpers
Olympic athletes of Brazil
Place of birth missing
Pan American Games athletes for Brazil
20th-century Brazilian women